Sweden is scheduled to compete at the 2024 Summer Olympics in Paris from 26 July to 11 August 2024. Swedish athletes have appeared in every edition of the Summer Olympic Games except for the sparsely attended St. Louis 1904.

Competitors
The following is the list of number of competitors in the Games.

Athletics

Swedish track and field athletes achieved the entry standards for Paris 2024, either by passing the direct qualifying mark (or time for track and road races) or by world ranking, in the following events (a maximum of 3 athletes each):

Track and road events

Equestrian

Sweden entered a full squad of equestrian riders each to the team dressage, eventing, and jumping competitions through a top-seven finish in dressage and top-five in jumping the 2022 FEI World Championships in Herning, Denmark, and through a top-six finish at the Eventing Worlds on the same year in Pratoni del Vivaro, Italy.

Dressage

Qualification Legend: Q = Qualified for the final based on position in group; q = Qualified for the final based on overall position

Eventing

Jumping

Shooting

Swedish shooters achieved quota places for the following events based on their results at the 2022 and 2023 ISSF World Championships, 2022, 2023, and 2024 European Championships, 2023 European Games, and 2024 ISSF World Olympic Qualification Tournament, if they obtained a minimum qualifying score (MQS) from 14 August 2022 to 9 June 2024.

Swimming

Swedish swimmers achieved the entry standards in the following events for Paris 2024 (a maximum of two swimmers under the Olympic Qualifying Time (OST) and potentially at the Olympic Consideration Time (OCT)):

References

2024
Nations at the 2024 Summer Olympics
2024 in Swedish sport